The Mingo Creek Viaduct, officially called the Joe Montana Bridges, are a pair of twin girder bridges that carry Pennsylvania Route 43 over the Mingo Creek, Pennsylvania Route 88, and the Wheeling and Lake Erie Railway between Union Township and Carroll Township, both of Washington County, Pennsylvania.

The bridges are named after Pro Football Hall of Fame NFL quarterback Joe Montana, who played for nearby Ringgold High School.

See also
 
 
 
 List of bridges in the United States by height

References

Road bridges in Pennsylvania
Steel bridges in the United States
Girder bridges in the United States